Larry Wilson may refer to:

 Larry Wilson (American football) (1938–2020), American football player
 Larry Wilson (basketball), American basketball player
 Larry Wilson (ice hockey) (1930–1979), Canadian ice hockey player
 Larry Wilson (meteorologist) (born 1937), American meteorologist
 Larry Wilson (musician), member of the American band Biota
 Larry Wilson (screenwriter) (born 1948), American screenwriter
 Larry Jon Wilson (1940–2010), American country singer, guitarist and musician
 Larry Y. Wilson (born 1949), American church authority

See also 
 Lawrence Wilson (disambiguation)